The Italian ambassador in Belgrade is the official representative of the Government in Rome to the Government of Serbia.

List of representatives 
<onlyinclude>

See also

 List of ambassadors to Serbia

References 

 
Serbia
Italy